Khao Plong Stadium  or Chai Nat Provincial Stadium is a stadium in Chai Nat Province, Thailand,  It is currently used for football matches and is the home stadium of Chainat Hornbill of the Thai League 1.  The stadium had the capacity to hold 5,574 spectators in 2011, but with expansion the stadium now can hold up to 12,000 spectators.

References

Football venues in Thailand